The women's 500 metres in short track speed skating at the 2002 Winter Olympics took place on 16 February at the Salt Lake Ice Center.

Records
Prior to this competition, the existing world and Olympic records were as follows:

The following new Olympic records were set during this competition.

Results

Heats
The first round was held on 16 February. There were eight heats, with the top two finishers moving on to the quarterfinals.

Heat 1

Heat 2

Heat 3

Heat 4

Heat 5

Heat 6

Heat 7

Heat 8

Quarterfinals
The top two finishers in each of the four quarterfinals advanced to the semifinals. Canada's Isabelle Charest was advanced to the semifinals, with Japan's Chikage Tanaka disqualified.

Quarterfinal 1

Quarterfinal 2

Quarterfinal 3

Quarterfinal 4

Semifinals
The top two finishers in each of the two semifinals qualified for the A final, while the third and fourth place skaters advanced to the B Final. In the first semifinal, a dead heat for second place, between Canada's Isabelle Charest and Caroline Hallisey of the United States, meant that both advanced to the final.

Semifinal 1

Semifinal 2

Finals
The five qualifying skaters competed in Final A, while four other raced for 6th place in Final B.

Final A

Final B

References

Women's short track speed skating at the 2002 Winter Olympics
Women's events at the 2002 Winter Olympics